Strobilanthes capitata is a species of flowering plant in the family Acanthaceae.

References

capitata